Ivvavik National Park is a national park of Canada located in Yukon. Initially named "Northern Yukon National Park," the park was renamed Ivvavik in 1992 for the Inuvialuktun word meaning "nursery" or "birthplace," in reference to the importance of the area as a calving ground for Porcupine caribou. Created as a result of the Inuvialuit Final Agreement in 1984, negotiated between the Canadian Government and the Inuvialuit of the Northern Yukon, Ivvavik is the first national park in Canada to be established as a result of an aboriginal land claims agreement. About 100 people visit the park each year.

Ivvavik contains the British Mountains which run east to west, parallel to the Arctic coast, and merge into the Brooks Range in Alaska.
Draining north through the Park from the British Mountains is the Firth River, the oldest river in Canada and considered one of the great rafting rivers of the world. The river starts from year-round aufeis formations at the headwaters and then flows through extensive canyon areas before forming a huge delta as it enters the Beaufort Sea just west of Herschel Island. The first raft descent was by Martyn Williams, Alan Dennis and Jim Boyde.
Gold miners have operated on the Firth River and at Sheep Creek until the area became a National Park. The area around Sheep Creek is the northernmost extension of Dall sheep habitat in Canada

The park contains many cultural sites of continuing importance to the local indigenous people, both Inuit and Indian.
Protecting a portion of the calving grounds of the caribou herd, the park allows only a minimal number of people to visit per year.

On the shore of Beaufort Sea, there is abundant game for Yukon wolves, grizzly bears, and black bears that inhabit the area. Other animals that inhabit this park two species of fox, Yukon moose, lemmings,  Dall sheep, gyrfalcons, muskoxen, and wolverines. The Arctic National Wildlife Refuge lies just across the border in Alaska.  The Firth River holds some of the longest stocks of Dolly Varden char in western Canada

On the south-east, Ivvavik National Park borders Vuntut National Park, established in 1995.  Due to land claims negotiations, Vuntut is still quite undeveloped and has no roads or developed trails.  Due to its undeveloped nature, several people have gotten lost and are presumed dead.

Activities such as rafting, fishing, wildlife viewing, camping, and hiking are available in the park. Rafting is available in late June to early August and rafting on the Firth River is a popular activity. A permit is required to fish in the park. There is a daily catch and possession limit of one Dolly Varden char with a restriction of three fish total. Camping is allowed in all areas of the park except archaeological sites and the park does not have any marked hiking trails.

See also

National Parks of Canada
List of National Parks of Canada
List of Yukon parks

References

External links

Official site

National parks in Yukon
Protected areas of the Arctic
Protected areas established in 1984